Charlie Chan in London is a 1934 American mystery film directed by Eugene Forde. The film stars Warner Oland as Charlie Chan. This is the sixth film produced by Fox with Warner Oland as the detective, and the second not to be lost, after The Black Camel (1931).

Robert Altman's film Gosford Park, set in 1932, features a (fictional) character who produces the Chan films for Fox and claims to be in England doing research for Charlie Chan in London.

Plot
A young English man is convicted of the murder of one Captain Hamilton of the Royal Air Force and sentenced to hang, His sister and her fiancé, convinced of his innocence, ask visiting detective Charlie Chan to investigate and find the real murderer. In order to solve the mystery, Chan must visit a lavish English country manor house, where the suspects vary from the housekeeper to a lawyer. Events soon indicate that the murderer is still actively trying to avoid capture, but Charlie Chan must set a trap to reveal the criminal's identity. He turns out to be Paul Frank, a spy masquerading under the name Geoffrey Richmond, who had murdered Captain Hamilton to steal plans of a military invention Hamilton had made.

Cast
Warner Oland as Charlie Chan
Drue Leyton as Pamela Gray
Ray Milland as Neil Howard (as Raymond Milland)
Mona Barrie as Lady Mary Bristol
Douglas Walton as Paul Gray
Alan Mowbray as Paul Frank, alias Geoffrey Richmond
George Barraud as Maj. Jardine
Paul England as Bunny Fothergill
Madge Bellamy as Becky Fothergill
Walter Johnson as Jerry Garton
Murray Kinnell as Captain Seton (alias Phillips, the butler)
E. E. Clive as Detective Sergeant Thacker
Elsa Buchanan as Alice Perkins (maid)
Reginald Sheffield as Flight Commander King
Perry Ivins as Assistant Home Secretary Kemp
John Rogers as Lake (chief groom)
C. Montague Shaw as Doctor
David Torrence as Home Secretary Sir Lionel Bashford
Claude King as RAF aerodrome commander
Arthur Clayton as Warden

References

External links

1934 films
1930s mystery thriller films
1930s crime thriller films
American crime thriller films
1930s English-language films
American black-and-white films
Charlie Chan films
American detective films
Films set in country houses
Fox Film films
Films directed by Eugene Forde
Films set in England
Films set in London
American mystery thriller films
1930s American films